Danbury station is a commuter rail station on the Danbury Branch of the Metro-North Railroad's New Haven Line, located in Danbury, Connecticut. The station is the northern terminus of Danbury Branch. The station is also a hub for Housatonic Area Regional Transit.

History

The original Danbury station opened in 1852 as the northern terminus of the Danbury and Norwalk Railroad. Throughout the history of the Danbury station, the station has had many different depots. The first depot was opened in 1852 and served as the headquarters for the D&N. The Danbury station would have three different depots over the course of its history from 1852 to today. The 1903-Built Union station, was an important part of Danbury's industrial expansion through the 1900s. However, By 1995, the Union station had fallen into complete disrepair, and was replaced by today's station in 1996.
The present passenger station was built in 1996 by the Connecticut Department of Transportation (ConnDOT) and replaced the older New Haven Railroad station, which now houses the Danbury Railway Museum.

Station layout

The station has one three-car-long high-level island platform on the north side of the two-tracks line. A stub siding serves the north side of the platform.

The station has 147 parking spaces, all of which are owned by the state.

References

External links 

Connecticut Department of Transportation, "Condition Inspection Danbury Station" report, July 2002
 Station from Google Maps Street View
 http://www.ct.gov/dot/lib/dot/documents/dpt/1_Station_Inspection_Summary_Report.pdf

Buildings and structures in Danbury, Connecticut
Stations along New York, New Haven and Hartford Railroad lines
Metro-North Railroad stations in Connecticut
Railway stations in the United States opened in 1996
Railroad stations in Fairfield County, Connecticut
1852 establishments in Connecticut